Cycas szechuanensis is a species of cycad endemic to eastern China. It is known from eastern Guangdong and eastern Fujian provinces, China. It is also cultivated at Fuhu Temple (伏虎寺), Mount Emei, Sichuan.

References

szechuanensis
Endemic flora of China
Plants described in 1975